The 10th Engineer Brigade (Brigada 10 Geniu) is an engineer brigade currently operational within the Romanian Land Forces, and subordinated to the General Staff of the Romanian Land Forces.

Organization 2020 
 10th Engineer Brigade "Dunărea de Jos", in Brăila
 52nd Engineer Battalion "Tisa", in Satu Mare
 72nd Engineer Battalion "General Constantin Savu", in Brăila (Bridging)
 96th Engineer Battalion "Joseph Kruzel", in Bucharest (Bridging)
 136th Engineer Battalion "Apulum", in Alba Iulia (Bridging)
 River Crossing Battalion, in Brăila
 110th Logistic Support Battalion "Mareșal Constantin Prezan", in Brăila

2012
10th Engineer Brigade in Brăila
 52nd Engineer Battalion "Tisa" in Satu Mare
 72nd Engineer Battalion "Matei Basarab" in Brăila
 136th Engineer Battalion "Apulum" in Alba Iulia
 River Crossing Battalion in Brăila
 110th Logistic Battalion in Brăila

References

External links
   Official Site of the Romanian Land Forces
  Official Site of the 2nd Infantry Division
  Official Site of the 10th Engineer Brigade

Brigades of Romania
Military units and formations established in 1968